People en Español is a Spanish-language American magazine published by Dotdash Meredith that debuted in 1996, originally as the Spanish-language edition of its publication People. As of 2009, it is the Spanish-language magazine with the largest readership in the United States, reaching 7.1 million readers with each issue. Distinguishing itself from its English-language counterpart, People en Español'''s original editorial content combines coverage from the Hispanic and general world of entertainment, articles on fashion and beauty, and human interest stories.  It was created and launched by Time Warner media executive Lisa Garcia. Angelo Figueroa was the magazine's founding managing editor, who led the editorial department for its first five years.

History

Time Inc. launched the Spanish-language edition of People magazine in 1996. The company has said in The New York Times that the new publication emerged after a 1995 issue of the original magazine was distributed with two distinct covers, one featuring slain Tejano singer Selena and another cover with cast members from Friends; the Selena cover sold out while the other did not.

Though the original idea was that Spanish-language translations of articles from the English magazine would comprise half the content of the newer publication, People en Español over time came to have a mix of 90% original content and 10% translated material perceived by editors to have inter-cultural importance.

Because the readership comprises Spanish-speakers of diverse backgrounds, the editorial staff goes to great lengths to use as neutral a variety of Spanish as possible. Staff member Betty Cortina told The Washington Post in 1996, "We police each other as we edit, making sure that we maintain a high-level, slang-free Spanish. We're trying to bust the myth that everyone wants a different kind of Spanish."

The magazine has received a number of accolades, including being named one of the "Most Notable Magazine Launches of the Past 20 Years" by Media Industry News (MIN). In April 2006, its publisher at the time, Jacqueline Hernández, was named Adweek Marketing y Medios' Executive of the Year. In March, 2007, People en Español was listed on Adweek's Hot List "10 under 50" for the fourth consecutive year.

In February 2022, it was revealed that People en Español would end print circulation and switch to an all digital format.

 Special issues 
Among the eleven issues that People en Español releases a year, there are several special issues including June's "Los 50 Más Bellos" (50 Most Beautiful), and December's "Estrella del Año" (Star of the Year). Special issues debuting in 2007 include February's "Los 100 Hispanos Más Influyentes" (100 Most Influential Hispanics) and November's "Sexiest Man Alive" issue, similar to People magazine's established franchise.

 Los 50 Más Bellos 
Since 1997, every June issue celebrates the most attractive Latino stars from the world of film, television, music, sports and politics. The list began with the Spring 1997 issue as the "25 Bellezas" (25 Beauties). In 2004, then-editor Richard Pérez-Feria increased the list to 50 and renamed the issue "50 Más Bellos" (50 Most Beautiful), in line with the People magazine franchise. For the June 2007 issue, then-editor Peter Castro selected the first non-Hispanic star to grace the Most Beautiful cover by placing Beyoncé Knowles along with 7 other Latin stars on the cover, and including her within the magazine as the 51st "honorary beauty."

Since 2002, the magazine has hosted an annual celebrity-attended event honoring the Most Beautiful in New York City during Television upfront week in May. Telemundo produced a two-hour special around the event from 2003 - 2007.

 Most Beautiful Cover Subjects 

Bello 51
In 2008 and 2009, People en Español teamed up with Yahoo! En Espanol and Telemundo to launch a nationwide search for the "51st Most Beautiful (El Bello 51)" to be featured in its "50 Most Beautiful" issue. The "51st Most Beautiful" search provides a unique opportunity for a non-celebrity to be featured in this celebrated issue. From Jan-Feb, Yahoo! En Espanol users had the opportunity to submit their photos at 51bello.com to compete for the title of People en Español's "51st Most Beautiful." In the weeks that follow, 25 finalists, as selected by People en Español, Yahoo! En Espanol and Telemundo, were to be posted on 51bello.com. During this time users were able to view contestant photos and profiles, comment and vote for their favorites.

 Estrellas del Año People en Español introduced the "Estrella del Año" (Star of the Year) issue in 2004, revealing the year's most unforgettable Hispanic personality, along with the significant events that defined the year. The release of this December/January issue is followed by a celebrity-attended event in Miami. In 2007, the magazine introduced the franchise as Estrellas del Año, honoring multiple entertainers that defined Hispanic entertainment. The Estrellas del Año issue has since been retired and replaced with the Premios People en Español issue, which made its debut in November 2009.

 Estrellas del Año cover subjects 

 Exclusives 
The magazine has been known to break world exclusives pertaining to Hispanic celebrities.

Puerto Rican actress Adamari López gave the magazine a world exclusive for their May 2006 issue, speaking for the first time since her breast cancer diagnosis kept her away from the media. Lopez shared with the magazine's editors the details of battling her illness and her relationship with the popular singer Luis Fonsi.

In an exclusive interview in the March 2007 issue, Mexican soap opera legend Verónica Castro, spoke about her estranged son, singer Cristian Castro, and the real reason for the animosity with daughter-in-law, Valeria Liberman. The actress also discussed her disappointment when Cristian Castro caused quite a media stir after his reconciliation with his father, comic Manuel Valdés.

In late August 2007, the magazine revealed that Cristian Castro had separated from his second wife. An exclusive interview was published in the October 2007 issue (on sale 9/3/07) with a cover line quoting "Quiero Ser Libre (I Want to Be Free)." Despite personally speaking to the magazine, Castro later denied what he said in the interview and hiding the divorce suit he presented in Miami. Castro emphasized that he will always lie to the press about his personal life. "I don't want the press to know about my personal life. I'm not here to share it; I'm here to sing. I will always lie to the press. Always expect lies about my personal life." He has since admitted to filing for divorce, but withdrew papers the next day.

In the November 2008 issue, People en Español took an in depth look at the marital troubles between Cuban-American journalist Myrka Dellanos and her husband of only six months, Ulysses Alonzo. Friends and sources close to the couple spoke exclusively with People en Español detailing what really lead to Dellanos' frantic 911 call and the battery charges against Alonzo.

Peopleenespanol.com
 Peopleenespanol is the accompanying website of the magazine, covering the latest Hispanic celebrity news, photos, gossip, fashion and beauty. In April 2007, a bilingual version of the site was developed for the first time, debuting with the launch of "Los 50 Más Bellos" 2007 exclusive content.

On October 19, 2007, the website was redesigned and relaunched with new content channels and video player.

In 2014, People en Español launched an in-book insert in English called Chica, targeted at millennial Latinas. In 2016, Chica launched as an English language content vertical in the site.

People en Español is currently edited by Charo Henríquez.

Official title

The company usually gives the title in all capital letters as PEOPLE EN ESPAÑOL when being discussed in Spanish (including on its own website).
Any references in English are as People en Español (including on the company's own media kit). This follows English-language conventions of capitalization, as the Spanish language does not capitalize proper nouns relating to nationality or language.

See alsoHispanic''

Notes

External links
 People en Español Official site

1996 establishments in the United States
Monthly magazines published in the United States
Magazines established in 1996
People (magazine)
Spanish-language magazines